Man Dandan (born May 5, 1989 in Harbin, Heilongjiang) is a Chinese cross-country skier who has competed since 2006. Competing in two Winter Olympics, she earned her best finish of 17th in the team sprint event at Vancouver in 2010 and earned her best individual finish of 51st in the individual sprint event at the same games.

Man's best finish at the FIS Nordic World Ski Championships was tenth twice (team sprint, 4 x 5 km) at Sapporo in 2007 while her best individual finish was 44th in the individual sprint event at those same championships.

Her best World Cup finish was eighth in an individual sprint event at China in 2007.

Man won gold in individual sprint event at the 2017 Asian Winter Games in Sapporo, Japan.

References

1989 births
Cross-country skiers at the 2006 Winter Olympics
Cross-country skiers at the 2010 Winter Olympics
Cross-country skiers at the 2014 Winter Olympics
Chinese female cross-country skiers
Living people
Olympic cross-country skiers of China
Asian Games medalists in cross-country skiing
Cross-country skiers at the 2007 Asian Winter Games
Cross-country skiers at the 2011 Asian Winter Games
Cross-country skiers at the 2017 Asian Winter Games
Asian Games gold medalists for China
Asian Games silver medalists for China
Asian Games bronze medalists for China
Medalists at the 2011 Asian Winter Games
Medalists at the 2017 Asian Winter Games
Skiers from Harbin